Alexander Salby (born 8 June 1998) is a Danish cyclist, who currently rides for UCI ProTeam .

Major results
2018
 6th Himmerland Rundt
2019
 3rd Youngster Coast Challenge
2020
 4th Road race, National Under–23 Road Championships
2021
 1st Overall Post Cup
 6th Fyen Rundt
2023
 1st Stage 7 La Tropicale Amissa Bongo

References

External links

1998 births
Living people
Danish male cyclists